WJEP (91.1 FM) is a Christian radio station licensed to Cusseta, Georgia.  The station serves the areas of Richland, Georgia and Lumpkin, Georgia, and is owned by Radio By Grace, Inc.

References

External links
WJEP's official website

JEP